Burnie/Yeoman Cricket Club (BYCC) is a cricket team which represents Burnie  in the North Western Tasmanian Cricket Association grade cricket competition, in the Australian state of Tasmania.

History Burnie Yeoman
The Burnie Yeoman Cricket Club was formed in 1989 when the Burnie Cricket Club and the Yeoman Cricket Clubs decided after many meetings to combine and form the Burnie Yeoman Cricket Club to be based at the Les Clarke Oval at Cooee, a suburb of the city of Burnie on the North West Coast of Tasmania A state of Australia.

Honours
NWTCA Premierships:

See also

Cricket Tasmania
Tasmanian Grade Cricket

References

External links

Tasmanian grade cricket clubs
1989 establishments in Australia
Cricket clubs established in 1989
Sport in Burnie, Tasmania